Iris hyrcana, the Hyrcana iris, is a plant species in the genus Iris, it is classified in the subgenus Hermodactyloides and section Reticulatae. It is a bulbous perennial from central Asia, from Azerbaijan to Iran.

Description
Iris hyrcana has spherical bulbs, that are coated with a solid brown fiberous network.

In the Northern Hemisphere it blooms in the winter, between November and January, or sometimes in February. The flowers are much smaller than those of other Reticulata irises.

Like other irises, it has two pairs of petals, three large sepals (outer petals), known as the "falls", and three inner, smaller petals (or tepals), known as the "standards". They come in shades of blue, from clear blue, to dark blue and purple. The falls have a bright yellow ridge, or orange mark.

Biochemistry
As most irises are diploid, having two sets of chromosomes, this can be used to identify hybrids and classification of groupings.
It was counted as 2n=20,

Taxonomy
The specific epithet hyrcana, refers to Hyrcania, a historical region composed of the land south-east of the Caspian Sea in modern-day Iran.

In 1848, specimens of the plant were originally collected in Azerbaijan.
It was described and published in 'Flora Kavkaza' by Alexander Grossheim in 1928.

Iris hyrcana is now an accepted name by the RHS, and it was verified by United States Department of Agriculture and the Agricultural Research Service on 4 April 2003, then updated on 11 December 2024.

It is listed in 1995 in 'Vascular Plants of Russia and adjacent States (the former USSR)' by Czerepanov, S. K.
 
It was once though to be a variant of Iris reticulata, except Iris hyrcana has spherical bulbs where as Iris reticulata bulbs are drop shaped.

Distribution and habitat
Iris hyrcana is native to temperate areas of western Asia.

Range
Originally found in the Hyrcanian woods, along the southern coast of the Caspian Sea from Azerbaijan to Iran.

Habitat
It is found growing in the mountains along the Caspian Sea.

Cultivation
It prefers to grow in sunny sites, on rocky soils that dry out completely in summer.

As it is not very hardy, but it can withstand strong frosts of short duration. Although it is thought to be best grown in the UK and in America, within a bulb frame or alpine house, to keep the soils dry. It also needs a dry, summer dormancy of several months.

A specimen of Iris hyrcana won the Farrer Medal at the AGS Caerleon Show, in South Wales, shown by Bob and Rannveig Wallis.

Toxicity
Like many other irises, most parts of the plant are poisonous (rhizome and leaves), if mistakenly ingested can cause stomach pains and vomiting. Also handling the plant may cause a skin irritation or an allergic reaction.

References

Other sources
 Komarov, V. L. et al., eds. 1934–1964. Flora SSSR. [lists as I. hyrcana (Woronow)] 
 Mathew, B. 1981. The Iris. 177

External links

hyrcana
Plants described in 1928
Flora of the Caucasus
Flora of Azerbaijan
Flora of Iran